The Hinckford Hundred was one of the 19 historic Hundreds of Essex, covering an area of approximately 110566 acres it lies to the north of Essex occupying most of what is now Braintree district.

Alternate Spellings

Hinckford Hundred, Hidincfort, Hidincforda, Hiding(a)forda, Hiding(a)fort, Hiding(h)afort, Hidingh(e)forda, Hidingeforda, Hedingfort 1086	DBHengham 1161-2	P, 1198 Cur, 1264 Misc, 1285 IpmHaingeford, He(y)ing(e)ford 1167-90 P, 1185 RotDom, 1219 Fees, 1235 AssHaingesford 1167 ChancRHeng(e)ford 1190 P, 1235-55 Ass	, 1238	SR, 1280 Ipm, 1346 FAHainford 1259	IpmHynkford p. 1420 FA hundred de Hynham 1470 MinAcct

The 47 parishes of Hinckford are as follows:

Alphamstone, Ashen, Belchamp Otten, Belchamp St Paul, Belchamp Walter, Birdbrook, Bocking, Borley, Braintree, Bulmer, Steeple Bumpstead, Bures, Felsted, Finchingfield, Foxearth, Gestingthorpe, Gosfield, Halstead, Great Henny, Little Henny, Haverhill, Castle Hedingham, Sible Hedingham, Lamarsh, Liston, Great Maplestead, Little Maplestead, Middleton, Ovington, Panfield, Pebmarsh, Pentlow, Rayne, Ridgewell, Great Saling, Shalford, Stambourne, Stebbing, Stisted, Sturmer, Tilbury Juxta Clare, Toppesfield, Twinstead, Wethersfield, Wickham St Paul, Great Yeldham, Little Yeldham

References

Hundreds of Essex